Edward Robert Martin Jr. is an American politician and attorney from the state of Missouri. He is president of Phyllis Schlafly Eagles. Martin was terminated from his role as CNN contributor in January 2018.

A Republican, Martin served as chief of staff for Governor Matt Blunt from 2006 until November 2007. He was the party's nominee for Missouri's 3rd congressional district in 2010, but lost the November 2010 general election to incumbent Democrat Russ Carnahan. Martin ran unsuccessfully for Missouri Attorney General in 2012 as the Republican nominee. In 2013, he was elected as Chairman of the Missouri Republican Party.

Early life and education
Ed Martin grew up in the Whitehouse Station section of Readington Township, New Jersey, the middle of three children of a lawyer father and nurse mother. Following his graduation from St. Peter's Preparatory School, Martin attended the College of the Holy Cross, majoring in English. While at Holy Cross he was awarded a Thomas J. Watson Fellowship to study water purification in Indonesia for a year. Leaving Indonesia, Martin next attended Pontifical Gregorian University in Rome, Italy, on a Rotary International scholarship, earning another bachelor's degree. While in Rome, he decided to attend law school and was accepted to Saint Louis University School of Law.

While at law school, Martin attended a Thanksgiving dinner with Pope John Paul II in 1997. Martin received an invitation to the dinner because he served as the sole youth representative expert of the Synod of the Bishops on the Americas.

Following graduation, Martin worked first as director of the Human Rights Office for the Archdiocese of St. Louis.

Legal career
As an attorney in private practice, Martin specialized in differing commercial and Pro bono cases. Martin did legal work for the Institute for Justice, Human Action Network, Bryan Cave, LLP, Americans United for Life, Martin Simmonds, LLC, and formed his own law practice, Ed Martin Law Firm, LLC. In addition, Martin served as law clerk for the United States Court of Appeals for the Eighth Circuit under the Honorable Pasco M. Bowman II.

In 2005 while working for Americans United for Life, Martin represented two Illinois pharmacists who sought relief from an administrative rule requiring Illinois pharmacists doing public business to dispense a certain contraceptive, levonorgestrol, also known as "Plan B" or the "morning after pill", under the state's health plan. They argued that such distribution violated their religious rights of conscience. Martin appeared on Lou Dobbs to discuss the case with Illinois Governor Rod Blagojevich. The court sided with Martin and the plaintiffs, agreeing that the Administrative Rule violated the Rights of Conscience Act; it granted the plaintiffs a permanent injunction.

In 2006 while doing pro bono work for the Institute for Justice and the Human Action Network, Martin represented a small business owner who sold caskets and funeral supplies at discounted prices. In an effort to regulate abuses in the funeral business, the State of Missouri required vendors of caskets to have a funeral director's license. Martin and other attorneys argued that the government should not prevent the businessman from selling caskets at a discount and helping people avoid inflated costs of purchasing a casket from funeral homes. Eventually, the State Board of Embalmers and Funeral Directors sided with the small business owner.

Political career
In 2005, Governor Matt Blunt appointed Ed Martin as chairman of the St. Louis Board of Election Commissioners. He also headed the leadership team that designed and implemented the Missouri Accountability Portal, an Internet search engine developed by the Blunt administration to track state government spending in order to increase transparency.

In August 2006, Governor Matt Blunt appointed Martin as his chief of staff. While serving as Blunt's chief of staff, Martin was linked to the controversial firing of Scott Eckersley, then Deputy General Counsel for Blunt. In the summer of 2007, Martin's office had resisted providing his emails to an investigative reporter from the Springfield (MO) News-Leader, who was investigating whether Martin used his office to influence outside groups against political opponents. Martin claimed there were no emails that pertained to the issue. A Blunt spokesman said the administration did not have a policy of retaining emails, although the state Sunshine Law requiring retention for 3 years is widely known.

The administration claimed it had fired Eckersley because he had violated internal policies. He filed a lawsuit against Martin and Blunt for his firing, saying he had been trying to enforce the state law for retention of emails. Several major media outlets filed suit to gain access to Martin's and other emails of the administration. Martin resigned as chief of staff in November 2007, followed by Blunt's General Counsel, Henry Herschel.

After a year-long battle to gain access, in November 2008, the Kansas City Star and the St. Louis Post-Dispatch analyzed and reported on 60,000 pages of emails obtained from the administration. They found that Martin had used his state office in 2007 improperly to encourage opposition to Attorney General Jay Nixon among anti-abortion groups, as the Democrat Nixon was likely to oppose Blunt in the next election. He had also pressured political appointees of state agencies to criticize Nixon's handling of some issues as AG. In addition, the newspapers reported that Martin had encouraged outside groups to oppose the nomination of Patricia Breckenridge to an open seat on the Missouri Supreme Court, although Blunt supported her. On May 22, 2009, the Missouri Attorney General's office announced that Eckersley's lawsuit against Blunt and others had been settled for $500,000.

In January 2008, Blunt surprised supporters by announcing he would not seek a second term. In February 2008 Governor Blunt appointed Martin as a member of the Missouri State Parks Advisory Board, a position he held until April 2011.

Following Blunt's leaving office, the state completed its own investigation of possible violations of the Sunshine Law under Blunt and Martin. It found that the governor's office failed to properly disclose Mr. Martin's emails." This investigation, which cost the state $2 million, found that Martin had illegally destroyed some emails, in violation of the state's open government or Sunshine Law.

In 2008, Martin founded the American Issues Project, a political group financed by Harold Simmons that ran anti-Senator Barack Obama TV ads during the 2008 United States presidential campaign.  Martin appeared on The O'Reilly Factor to discuss the group's commercials.

Martin was executive director of the Missouri Club for Growth, a PAC to support certain candidates financially, and president of the Missouri Roundtable for Life, a pro-life, non-profit group. He also founded Term Limits for Missouri in 2010, which works to pass laws for term limits on all statewide elective positions in the state.

In 2016, Martin co-authored The Conservative Case for Trump with Phyllis Schlafly and Brett M. Decker.

2010 U.S. congressional election

In 2010, Martin challenged Democratic incumbent Russ Carnahan. Carnahan defeated Martin.

2012 Attorney General election

Martin decided to run for the U.S. Senate in 2012 against incumbent Democrat U.S. Senator Claire McCaskill. After U.S. Congressman Todd Akin and former state treasurer Sarah Steelman filed to run, Martin dropped out of the race to run from the newly redrawn Missouri's 2nd congressional district, Akin's congressional seat. On January 26, 2012, Martin announced he was dropping out of the Congressional race, and filed to run for Missouri Attorney General against incumbent Democrat Chris Koster.

Republican Chair
On January 5, 2013 Ed Martin was elected as the new Chairman of the Missouri Republican Party, replacing David Cole. Martin was elected in the second round of balloting by the Republican State Committee, defeating Cole 34 votes to 32. Former Missouri State Senator Jane Cunningham was also a candidate for the party leadership. Noting that state Republican Party officials were often more conservative than most of their members, the St. Louis Post-Dispatch editorialized that Martin was an unfortunate choice for the GOP. They commented on his having cost the state "taxpayers about $2 million for an investigation spurred by his destruction of public records when he was chief of staff to Gov. Matt Blunt."

As party chairman, Martin criticized advertising in the Republican primary campaign for the United States Senate election in Mississippi, 2014, which was marked by race-based ads appearing to encourage Democrats to vote in support of candidate Thad Cochran, as well as robo-calls to African-American voters thought to be made by his opponent Chris McDaniel's campaign, which were derogatory to President Barack Obama. It was reported that Cochran and allies were "looking to increase voter turnout across the state, particularly among African Americans and Democrats who had not voted in the June 3 primary." Martin criticized any race-based advertising by Republican candidates. "I don’t know how that can be allowed in the Republican party," Martin says. "If it is, we have no credibility, we have no moral standing."

McDaniel lost the primary by 7,000 votes but refused to concede, marring party efforts to prepare for the general election. In addition, Martin made a motion to censure Barbour at the annual RNC August summer meeting in Chicago. This effort fizzled, but the issue was discussed in member meetings. Henry Barbour is the nephew of former Mississippi Governor Haley Barbour.

Electoral history

Personal life
Ed Martin is married to Carol Martin, a physician who works in St. Louis County.

Ed's younger brother James T. Martin is a career Marine officer, promoted to Lt. Colonel in 2013. He wrote The Development of Marine Corps Junior Officers during the Interwar Period and its Relevance Today.

References

External links
Campaign website
 
Campaign contributions at OpenSecrets.org

Candidates in the 2012 United States elections
Chiefs of staff to United States state governors
College of the Holy Cross alumni
Living people
Missouri Republicans
People from Readington Township, New Jersey
Politicians from St. Louis
Saint Louis University School of Law alumni
St. Peter's Preparatory School alumni
Year of birth missing (living people)
Candidates in the 2010 United States elections